Gertrude Mary Zichy-Woinarski  (2 March 1874 – 4 November 1955) was an Australian welfare worker. She was made a Member of the Order of the British Empire (MBE) in the 1954 Birthday Honours "for distinguished services to many charitable organisations." During age 26 she was elected a member of the Melbourne Ladies' Benevolent Society Gertrude became a 'district visitor' in North Melbourne. In August 1913 she was elected a vice-president of the society.

Zichy-Woinarski was born in Ballarat, Victoria to English-born parents, Henry Brind and his wife Hester Bennet, née Goodfellow. She married Victor Joseph Emanuel Zichy-Woinarski in 1895, with whom she had four children. She died in Mordialloc, Melbourne, Victoria.

See also
 George Michael Prendergast

References

External links

1874 births
1955 deaths
Australian social workers
Australian people of English descent
Gertrude
People from Ballarat